Rana Azadivar (born 6 April 1983) is an Iranian actress. She is best known for her role as Faezeh in The Lizard (2004). Azadivar gained wide recognition after portraying the leading role of Samira in the widely streamed drama series Mortal Wound (2021).

Filmography

Film

Web

Music video

Theatre

Awards and nominations

References

External links
 
 

1983 births
Living people
People from Tehran
Actresses from Tehran
Iranian film actresses
Iranian stage actresses
Iranian television actresses
21st-century Iranian actresses